Breed of Men is a 1919 American Western silent film directed by Lambert Hillyer and written by J.G. Hawks. The film stars William S. Hart, Seena Owen, Bert Sprotte and Buster Irving. The film was released on February 2, 1919, by Paramount Pictures.

Plot

Cast 
 William S. Hart as Careless Carmody, A Boss Rider
 Seena Owen as Ruth Fellows
 Bert Sprotte as Wesley B. Prentice
 Buster Irving as Bobby Fellows

Preservation status
 A print is preserved in the Museum of Modern Art (MOMA) collection.

References

External links 
 
 
  lantern slide(archived)

1919 films
1919 Western (genre) films
American black-and-white films
Films directed by Lambert Hillyer
Paramount Pictures films
Silent American Western (genre) films
Surviving American silent films
1910s English-language films
1910s American films